Blagoja Gesoski (born 28 April 1981) was a Macedonian football striker and attacking midfielder who has played for clubs in Macedonia, Greece and Albania. He now works as the Director of Football at Pobeda.

Honours
Pobeda Prilep
Macedonian First League: 2
Winner: 2003–04, 2006–07
Macedonian Cup: 1
Winner: 2001–02
Macedonian Second League: 1
Winner: 2015–16

Career
Born in Prilep, Gesoski played for local side FK Pobeda, leading the Macedonian league in goal-scoring three times and winning the 2003–04 and 2006–07 championships. After ten seasons with Pobeda, he would join Macedonian sides FK Milano Kumanovo and FK Metalurg Skopje for short spells.

Gesoski joined Greek second division side Diagoras F.C. on a six-month contract in January 2010.

Gesoski joined the reformed Pobeda in June 2013, where he played for almost 7 years and helped the club return to the Macedonian First League.

Gesoski retired as a player at the end of the first half of the 2020-21 season.

References

External links
Profile at epae.org
Profile at macedonianfootball.com

1981 births
Living people
Sportspeople from Prilep
Macedonian footballers
Association football forwards
FK Pobeda players
FK Milano Kumanovo players
FK Metalurg Skopje players
Diagoras F.C. players
KS Kastrioti players
FK 11 Oktomvri players
FK Vardar players
Macedonian First Football League players
Football League (Greece) players
Kategoria e Parë players
Macedonian Second Football League players
Macedonian expatriate footballers
Expatriate footballers in Greece
Macedonian expatriate sportspeople in Greece
Expatriate footballers in Albania
Macedonian expatriate sportspeople in Albania